Yarnell is a census-designated place (CDP) in Yavapai County, Arizona, United States. The population of Yarnell was 649 at the 2010 census. Yarnell's economy is based on ranching, mining and services to travelers and retirees. Peeples Valley, three miles north, is closely linked to Yarnell.

History
Gold was discovered in Yarnell in about 1865 by  Charles Genung (1839–1916), a well-known area pioneer. The community is named for Harrison Yarnell, a later prospector, who discovered the Yarnell mine in 1873. Old U.S. Route 89 (now State Route 89), which goes through Yarnell,  was paved in 1933, and for many years was the main highway from Phoenix to Wickenburg, Prescott and northern Arizona.

On June 30, 2013, the Yarnell Hill Fire destroyed half of the town and killed 19 firefighters.

Geography
Yarnell is located at  (34.222569, -112.749608).

Attractions

Yarnell Hill, which Highway 89 descends 1,300 feet in four miles, is a popular scenic drive. There is a developed lookout point at the top – only accessible from the downhill road.

The newest Arizona State Park, Granite Mountain Hotshots Memorial State Park, is just 3 miles south of Yarnell on State Highway 89. It was dedicated in 2016 as a place to remember the 19 Granite Mountain Hotshot Firefighters who were lost on June 30, 2013, while fighting the Yarnell Hill Fire. The hike is approximately 3.5 miles long from the trailhead to the Fatality Site, for a full length of about 7 miles. It is a somewhat difficult hike, with several up and down grades.

Yarnell Hill Fire Memorial Park is located in downtown Yarnell across from the Yarnell Fire Department’s administration building. Several etched metal signs give information about the Fire and about how it affected the citizens of Yarnell and Peeples Valley.

The Shrine of St. Joseph of the Mountains is a Catholic religious monument which features statuary hidden in the boulders. A short trail leads visitors through the stations of the cross.

The ghost towns of Stanton, Octave and Congress are nearby, as well as Harper's Flat, the first place on the right (east side of highway) at the top of Yarnell Hill. Harper's Flat also contains the old rest area for the highway that was built in 1925 and old mining buildings. The original stage road to the town of Stanton is on this property as well and still visible. A very interesting place to visit, although it is private property, the owners do allow people to drive through and take photos. This property is just south of the Ranch House Restaurant. Rich Hill in Weaver was the richest placer gold discovery in Arizona, discovered in 1863 by a party led by the mountain man Pauline Weaver and the prospector A. H. Peeples. All are popular with amateur prospectors and ghost town buffs.

Other attractions include hiking, UTV riding, gold prospecting, shopping, and restaurants.

Yarnell also includes a small community known as Glen Ilah.

Demographics

At the 2000 census, there were 645 people, 359 households and 188 families residing in the CDP. The racial makeup of the CDP was 96.9% White, 0.2% Black or African American, 0.2% Native American, 0.2% Pacific Islander, 1.1% from other races, and 1.6% from two or more races. 1.9% of the population were Hispanic or Latino of any race.

There were 359 households, of which 10.6% had children under the age of 18 living with them, 41.8% were married couples living together, 6.1% had a female householder with no husband present, and 47.6% were non-families. 40.9% of all households were made up of individuals, and 17.5% had someone living alone who was 65 years of age or older. The average household size was 1.80 and the average family size was 2.35.

11.2% of the population were under the age of 18, 1.7% from 18 to 24, 16.4% from 25 to 44, 37.7% from 45 to 64, and 33.0% who were 65 years of age or older. The median age was 57 years. For every 100 females, there were 114.3 males. For every 100 females age 18 and over, there were 113.0 males.

The median household income was $24,792 and the median family income was $35,417. Males had a median income of $33,333 compared with $23,750 for females. The per capita income for the CDP was $18,837. About 11.5% of families and 14.0% of the population were below the poverty line, including 18.0% of those under age 18 and 5.0% of those age 65 or over.

Education
The Yarnell Elementary School District 52 serves students in grades Pre-K to 8 for most of the CDP, while a section of the CDP lies in the Congress Elementary School District. The former district operates Model Creek School.

After the 8th grade, Model Creek students move on to Prescott High School of the Prescott Unified School District. Previously Model Creek students could choose between that school and Wickenburg High School of the Wickenburg Unified School District, but in order to reduce taxes, the Yarnell Elementary District board removed the Wickenburg option in November 2018. The Congress district sends high school students to Wickenburg High. Congress district students attended Wickenburg USD for all grade levels prior to 2001, when the Congress K-8 facility opened.

References

External links
 Gilligans Pizza Restaurant and Bar started in 2018
 A tribute to the Granite Mountain Hotshots written by local Yarnell resident Denise Roggio
 Yarnell & Peeples Valley Chamber of Commerce
 Yarnell history and information , by a local resident
 Yarnell-Peeples Valley community profile, by Arizona Department of Commerce
 Yarnell Mine, information and references}
 Yarnell – ghosttowns.com

Census-designated places in Yavapai County, Arizona